Mouz (stylized as MOUZ), formerly mousesports, is a professional esports organisation based in Germany. It fields teams in several games but is particularly known for its CS:GO team. MOUZ was one of the founding members of the G7 Teams. MOUZ's League of Legends team currently competes in the ESL Pro Series, having formerly competed in the European Challenger Series.

History 
mousesports was formed in 2002 in Berlin, Germany, as a Counter-Strike team. The team began to compete in small tournaments, which gradually lead to their progression in larger ones, as well. By 2006, when G7 Teams was created, mousesports was one of the greatest gaming organisations in Europe, consisting of Counter-Strike, Warcraft III, Quake 4, Battlefield 1942 and Unreal Tournament divisions.

On 13 May 2007, mousesports announced that it had acquired Nihilum, the officially recognised premiere worldwide World of Warcraft organisation, with Nihilum recognised as a subsidiary of mousesports. The guild was remade into a community called "Nihilum: mousesports MMO". Nihilum was mousesports' consistently strongest gaming team in the European competition. However, the relations between mousesports and Nihilum grew uncertain in the fall of 2008 and finally, on 10 November, it was announced that the former PvE team of SK Gaming would be merging with the players of Nihilum, effectively ending the partnership that lasted for over a year and a half. Despite this, however, mousesports continued to maintain the Nihilum brand and on 1 August 2009, launched a new community website to connect the World of Warcraft guild Method, along with the WotLK Wiki and the Nihilum brand under a single domain.

On 20 April 2009, mousesports announced that it would be withdrawing its support for Defense of the Ancients despite the huge amount of success they were having. In early 2010, the organisation announced the addition of a star-studded StarCraft: Brood War roster, which originally consisted of several American, Canadian, German, Polish and Ukrainian players. Since their original induction into the organisation, the team completely switched focus to StarCraft II during the Wings of Liberty beta period and has since become one of the greatest-renowned teams. In one of the greatest-known tragedies in electronic sports history, mouz Counter-Strike player Antonio "cyx" Daniloski died on 29 July 2010 in a car accident caused by tire failure after missing a flight to China to compete for his team. The aftermath of his death featured numerous memorials, tributes, eulogies and a permanent dedication on the official mousesports website. Several months following Daniloski's death, mousesports announced the retirement of remaining Counter-Strike players Fatih "gob b" Dayik, Navid "Kapio" Javadi and stand-in Christian "Blizzard" Chmiel, effective following the ESL Pro Series Season XVII Finals.

In March 2012, mousesports announced that it would be ending its support of its Counter-Strike division, citing the organisation's perception of the lack of market, considering the rising prominence of Dota 2 and League of Legends. Mouz picked up a new Counter-Strike: Global Offensive roster later that year.

In April 2017, mousesports signed the roster of the former Dota 2 team, Ad Finem, marking the first return for the organisation to the game in nearly two years.

On 2 August, Christian 'loWel' Garcia was released from his contract with mousesports. On 4 August former Penta Sports player Miikka 'suNny' Kemppi was announced as his replacement. Less than a week later, on 8 August, mousesports released Denis 'denis' Howell from his contract and signed Martin 'STYKO' Styk to replace him, formerly of HellRaisers.

In December 2017, the mousesports Dota 2 team disbanded.

In March 2018, mousesports signed their first full roster for competition in Tom Clancy's Rainbow Six Siege.

On 27 June, mousesports announced the acquisition of Janusz "Snax" Pogorzelski from Virtus.pro as a replacement for the benched Martin "STYKO" Styk.

On 30 July, mousesports announced that they were acquiring the Rocket League team of Tigreee, Alex161, and Skyline. Alex161 and Skyline previously played under Servette Esports, with Tigreee being acquired from Team Secret. This Mousesports team began play in RLCS Season 6, as Alex161 and Skyline retained their qualified spot won under Servette.

On 15 October, mousesports announced the return of Martin "STYKO" Styk to the starting line-up.

On 15 November, the coach of the Tom Clancy's Rainbow Six Siege team announced the team was dropped by mousesports and he would not stay with the team.

On 10 January 2019, mousesports announced the acquisition of Linus "al0t" Möllergren from compLexity Gaming, replacing Skyline.

On 13 February 2019, mousesports announced the signing of their second Tom Clancy's Rainbow Six Siege team, the former ENCE esports Tom Clancy's Rainbow Six Siege roster, as well as coach Michiel "oVie" van Dartel but later dropped the team on 1 July 2019.

On 14 March, mousesports revamps their roster with the acquisition of woxic, frozen, and karrigan. While oskar is released, suNny and STYKO is benched from the line-up.

On 22 June 2020, mousesports announced their withdrawal from the RLCS and competitive Rocket League as a whole and released their roster.

Tournament results

Counter-Strike 
 3rd — World Cyber Games 2002
 3rd — CPL Europe Cannes 2002
 3rd — CPL Europe Copenhagen 2002
 3rd — CPL Winter 2003
 5–8th — ESWC 2004
 7th — CPL Summer 2004
 3rd — World e-Sports Games Season 1
 1st — CPL Spain 2005
 3rd — ESWC 2005
 5th — Intel Summer Championship 2006
 5–6th — IEM Season I World Championship
 4th — WSVG Louisville 2007
 1st — IEM Season II World Championship
 3rd — ESWC Masters of Paris
 4th — ESWC 2008
 1st — IEM Season III Global Challenge Dubai
 2nd — World e-Sports Masters 2008
 3rd — ESWC Masters of Cheonan
 1st — GameGune 2009
 1st — IEM Season IV Global Challenge Gamescon
 1st — IEM Season IV European Championship
 2nd — Arbalet Cup Dallas 2010
 5–8th — Copenhagen Games 2011
 5–6th — World e-Sports Games: e-Stars Seoul 2011
 2nd — IEM Season VI Global Challenge Guangzhou
 3rd — ESWC 2011
 4th — DreamHack Winter 2011

Counter-Strike: Global Offensive

2012 
 3rd–4th — Sound Blaster CS:GO Challenge
 3rd–4th — DreamHack Winter 2012

2014 
 13–16th — EMS One Katowice 2014
 5–8th — Gfinity G3
 7–8th — ESEA S17 LAN
 4th — Acer A-Split Invitational

2015 
 4th — ESEA S18 LAN
 3rd–4th — Gfinity Summer Masters I
 3rd–4th — CEVO S7 LAN
 2nd — Acer Predator Masters Season 1
 4th — IEM Season X Gamescom
 13–16th — ESL One Cologne 2015
 9–12th — DreamHack Open Cluj-Napoca 2015
 2nd — CEVO S8 LAN

2016 
 1st — Acer Predator Masters Season 2
 7–8th — IEM Season X World Championship
 9–12th — MLG Major Championship: Columbus
 5–8th — DreamHack Masters Malmö 2016
 9–12th — ESL One Cologne 2016
 3rd–4th — ELeague Season 1
 3rd–4th — ESL Pro League Season 4 Finals

2017 
 12–14th — ELEAGUE Major 2017
 5–8th — DreamHack Masters Las Vegas 2017
 12–14th — PGL Major Kraków 2017
 1st — ESG Tour: Mykonos, 2017 
 3rd–4th — DreamHack Open Denver 2017 
 2nd — ECS Season 4 Finals

2018 
 5–8th — ELEAGUE Major: Boston 2018
 1st — StarLadder Starseries & iLeague Season 4
 1st — V4 Future Sports Festival 
 3rd–4th — StarSeries i-League Season 5 
 5–6th — ESL Pro League Season 7 
 15–16th — FACEIT Major: London 2018
 1st — ESL One New York 2018

2019 
 1st — Dreamhack Open Tours 2019
 3rd–4th — ESL Pro League Season 9 Finals
 9–11th — StarLadder Major: Berlin 2019
 1st — CS:GO Asia Championships
 1st — ESL Pro League Season 10 Finals
 1st — CS_Summit 5
 2nd — EPICENTER 2019

2020 
 1st — ICE Challenge 2020.
 2nd — ESL Pro League Season 11
 1st–2nd — BLAST Premier Fall 2020 Showdown
 2nd — Dreamhack Masters Winter 2020 Europe
 7th–8th — BLAST Premier Fall 2020

2021 
 3rd–4th — cs_summit 7
 1st — Flashpoint Season 3 (RMR)
 12th–14th — PGL Major Stockholm 2021

2022 
 2nd — Global Esports Tour Dubai 2022
 3rd–4th — IEM Rio Major 2022

2023 
 13rd–16th — Katowice 2023

Tom Clancy's Rainbow Six Siege

References

External links 
 

Organizations established in 2002
Esports teams established in 2002
Fighting game player sponsors
Esports teams based in Germany
2002 establishments in Germany
StarCraft teams
European Regional League teams
Heroes of the Storm teams
Counter-Strike teams
Dota teams
FIFA (video game series) teams
Defunct and inactive Overwatch teams
Team Razer
Rocket League teams
Tom Clancy's Rainbow Six Siege teams